Saint-Athanase is a municipality in Témiscouata Regional County Municipality in the Bas-Saint-Laurent region of Quebec, Canada, located on the Canada–United States border.

See also
 West Branch Little Black River (Quebec–Maine), a stream
 Boucanée River, a stream
 List of municipalities in Quebec

References

Municipalities in Quebec
Incorporated places in Bas-Saint-Laurent